Arkhanka is a rural locality (a village) in Krasnoplamenskoye Rural Settlement, Alexandrovsky District, Vladimir Oblast, Russia. The population was 12 as of 2010. There is 1 street.

Geography 
Arkhanka is located 33 km northwest of Alexandrov (the district's administrative centre) by road. Prokino is the nearest rural locality.

References 

Rural localities in Alexandrovsky District, Vladimir Oblast
Alexandrovsky Uyezd (Vladimir Governorate)